A pumapard is a hybrid of a cougar and a leopard. Both male cougar with female leopard and male leopard with female cougar pairings have produced offspring. In general, these hybrids have exhibited a tendency to dwarfism.

Characteristics
Whether born to a male cougar mated to a leopardess, or to a male leopard mated to a female cougar, pumapards inherit a form of dwarfism. Those reported grew to only half the size of the parents. They have a long, cougar-like body (proportional to the limbs, but nevertheless shorter than either parent) with short legs. The coat is variously described as sandy, tawny or grayish with brown, chestnut or "faded" rosettes.

One is preserved in the Walter Rothschild Zoological Museum at Tring, England, and clearly shows the tendency to dwarfism. This hybrid was exhibited at the Tierpark in Stellingen (Hamburg), Germany. A black and white photograph of the Tring hybrid appeared in Animals of the World (1917) with the caption "This is a photograph from life of a very rare hybrid. That animal's father was a puma, its mother a leopard. It is now dead and it may be seen stuffed in Mr. Rothschild's Museum at Tring."

History
In the late 1890s/early 1900s, two hybrids were born in Chicago, United States, followed two years later by three sets of twin cubs born at a zoo in Hamburg, Germany, from a cougar father and leopard mother. Carl Hagenbeck apparently bred several litters of  hybrids in 1898 at the suggestion of a menagerie owner in Great Britain; this was possibly Lord Rothschild (as one of the hybrids is preserved in his museum) who may have heard of the two hybrid cubs bred in Chicago in 1896 and suggested that Hagenbeck reproduce the pairing.

Hagenbeck's cougar/leopard hybrids may have been inspired by a pair of  hybrid cubs born in Chicago on 24 April 1896 at Tattersall's indoor arena, where Ringling Brothers Circus opened its season: 

A similar hybrid was reported by Helmut Hemmer. These hybrids had cougar-like long tails and sandy or tawny coats with chestnut leopard-like markings and cougar-like cheek markings. Another was described as resembling a little gray puma with large brown rosettes.

Henry Scherren wrote: 

In his Guide, Dr. Heck described it as a little grey puma with large brown rosettes. Another hybrid between the same species, but with a puma for sire and a leopard for dam, was recently at Stellingen; it resembled the female parent in form as may be seen from the reproduction from a photograph taken there.

According to Carl Hagenbeck (1951), a male cougar and female leopard produced a hybrid male cub that was reared by a Fox Terrier bitch at Hagenbeck Tierpark, Hamburg (fostering being normal practice at this time). This male hybrid was intermediate between the cougar and leopard in color and pattern, having faint leopard spots on a cougar-colored background.  The body length was much less than either parent, while the tail was long, like the cougar. Hagenbeck apparently bred these hybrids at the suggestion of an unidentified menagerie owner; however, the hybrids were considered dull and uninteresting. Modern geneticists find them more interesting because the leopard and the cougar were not considered to be closely enough related to produce offspring.

H. Petzsch (1956) mentioned that puma/leopard hybrids had been obtained by artificial insemination.  H. Hemmer (1966) reported the hybrid between a male Indian leopard (P. p. fusca) and a female puma as being fairly small, with a ground color like that of the puma and having rather faded rosettes.

The hybrids were additionally reported by C. J. Cornish et al. (undated), R. Rörig (1903), T. Haltenorth (1936), and O. Antonius (1951).

See also
 Felid hybrids - small cat hybrids
 Panthera hybrids - hybrids between lions, tigers, leopards and jaguars

Note

References 

 

Felid hybrids
Intergeneric hybrids
Cougar